Świerczynki may refer to various places in Poland:

Świerczynki, Brodnica County
Świerczynki, Toruń County